Henry Clarke Wilson (2 February 1869 – 16 December 1945) was a New Zealand rugby union player and cricketer.

Rugby union
He and was a member of the New Zealand national side on their 1893 tour of Australia, playing in seven matches, scoring 12 points in all. He did not appear in any full internationals as New Zealand did play its first Test match until 1903.

Cricket
Wilson played nine first-class matches for Hawke's Bay between 1896 and 1901. He scored 256 runs, at an average of 21.33 and a high score of 35. A right-arm medium-pace bowler, he took 17 wickets at an average of 19.64, with best bowling figures of 4 for 22.

Death
Clarke died in Christchurch on 16 December 1945, and was buried at Ruru Lawn Cemetery.

References

1869 births
1945 deaths
Burials at Ruru Lawn Cemetery
Canterbury rugby union players
Cricketers from Otago
Hawke's Bay cricketers
Hawke's Bay rugby union players
Manawatu rugby union players
New Zealand cricketers
New Zealand international rugby union players
New Zealand rugby union players
Rugby union fullbacks
Rugby union players from Otago